This is a list of bridges and tunnels on the National Register of Historic Places in the U.S. state of Wyoming.
Of the 40 bridges listed only 14 still exist.

References

 
Wyoming
Bridges on the National Register of Historic Places
Bridges on the National Register of Historic Places